Lombardville is an unincorporated community in Stark County, Illinois, United States, located  north of Bradford.

History
Lombardville served as a station for the Chicago, Burlington and Quincy Railroad. Lombardville was platted on July 8th of 1870 and served as a station for the Buda Rushville Railroad Branch which connected with the Chicago, Burlington and Quincy Railroad system. In the early 1870's the town had a hotel, grain elevator, and the Lombardville mining company. 
A post office called Lombardville was established in 1870, and remained in operation until it was discontinued in 1931. The community was named for the Lombard family, the original owners of the town site.

Additional Resource

References

Unincorporated communities in Stark County, Illinois
Unincorporated communities in Illinois
Peoria metropolitan area, Illinois